Nomaua is a genus of Polynesian araneomorph spiders in the family Physoglenidae that was first described by Raymond Robert Forster in 1990. Originally placed with the Linyphiidae, it was moved to the Synotaxidae in 1990, and is now considered a senior synonym of Wairua.

Species
 it contains twelve species, found on the Polynesian Islands:
Nomaua arborea Forster, 1990 – New Zealand
Nomaua cauda Forster, 1990 – New Zealand
Nomaua crinifrons (Urquhart, 1891) (type) – New Zealand
Nomaua nelson Forster, 1990 – New Zealand
Nomaua perdita Forster, 1990 – New Zealand
Nomaua rakiura Fitzgerald & Sirvid, 2009 – New Zealand (Stewart Is.)
Nomaua repanga Fitzgerald & Sirvid, 2009 – New Zealand
Nomaua rimutaka Fitzgerald & Sirvid, 2009 – New Zealand
Nomaua taranga Fitzgerald & Sirvid, 2009 – New Zealand
Nomaua urquharti Fitzgerald & Sirvid, 2009 – New Zealand
Nomaua waikanae (Forster, 1990) – New Zealand
Nomaua waikaremoana Forster, 1990 – New Zealand

See also
 List of Physoglenidae species

References

Araneomorphae genera
Physoglenidae
Spiders of New Zealand
Taxa named by Raymond Robert Forster